This is a list of Members of Parliament elected in the 1938 Northern Ireland general election.

All members of the Northern Ireland House of Commons elected at the 1938 Northern Ireland general election are listed.

Members

Changes
29 September 1938: Norman Stronge elected for the Unionists in Mid Armagh, following the resignation of John Clarke Davison.
5 December 1938: Howard Stevenson elected as a Unionist for Queen's University, following the death of Robert James Johnstone.
1938: James Brown accepted the Ulster Unionist whip.
30 March 1939: Death of George Leeke, MP for Mid Londonderry.  This position remained unfilled at the time of the 1945 general election.
27 April 1939: William Lowry elected for the Unionists in City of Londonderry, following the resignation of Edward Sullivan Murphy.
10 November 1939: Malcolm Patrick elected for the Unionists in Bannside, following the death of George Charles Gillespie Young.
15 March 1941: George Dougan elected for the Unionists in Central Armagh, following the death of David Shillington.
27 March 1941: Thomas Bailie elected as an independent Unionist in North Down, following the death of James Craig.
2 July 1941: Michael McGurk elected as an independent Nationalist in Mid Tyrone, following the death of Hugh McAleer.
3 December 1941: Harry Midgley elected for the Northern Ireland Labour Party in Belfast Willowfield, following the resignation of Arthur Black.
2 April 1942: Eamon Donnelly elected as an independent Republican in Belfast Falls, following the death of Richard Byrne
19 October 1942: William Lyle elected as a Unionist for Queen's University, following the death of Arthur Brownlow Mitchell.
1942: Jack Beattie re-admitted into the Northern Ireland Labour Party.
December 1942: Harry Midgley resigned from the Northern Ireland Labour Party and founds the Commonwealth Labour Party.
2 July 1943: John W. Renshaw elected as a Unionist for Queen's University, following the resignation of Robert Corkey.
11 August 1943: Thomas Lyons elected for the Unionists in North Tyrone, following the death of James Gamble.
26 August 1943: John Dermot Campbell elected for the Unionists in Carrick, following the resignation of John Fawcett Gordon.
1943: Jack Beattie resigned from the Northern Ireland Labour Party to sit as an independent Labour MP.
13 December 1944: Herbert Quin elected as a Unionist for Queen's University, following the resignation of John MacDermott.
29 December 1944: Death of Eamon Donnelly, MP for Belfast Falls.  This position remained unfilled at the time of the general election.
12 April 1945: William McCoy elected for the Unionists in South Tyrone, following the death of Rowley Elliott.
19 April 1945: Lancelot Curran elected for the Unionists in Carrick, following the death of John Dermot Campbell.
19 April 1945: Walter Topping elected for the Unionists in Larne, following the death of Harold Claude Robinson.
1945: Thomas Bailie accepted the Ulster Unionist Party whip.

References
Biographies of Members of the Northern Ireland House of Commons

1938